Hemans may refer to:

 Felicia Hemans (1793–1835), English poet
 Charles Isidore Hemans (1817–1876), English antiquary and publisher
 Hemans, Michigan, an unincorporated community on M-53 in the U.S. state of Michigan